The 1941–42 Illinois Fighting Illini men's basketball team represented the University of Illinois.

Regular season
The Illinois Fighting Illini finished the season with a record of 18 wins and 5 losses. Under the direction of head coach and athletic director Douglas Mills, the Illini grouped a team of players, all around 6' 3", into a nearly undefeatable lineup later to be known as "The Whiz Kids". This group captured the attention of the entire nation while winning back-to-back conference titles and combining for a 35-6 record, 25-2 in the Big Ten over those two seasons. They dazzled crowds everywhere averaging 58 points per game, while most teams were averaging in the low 40s.  Primarily made up of sophomores, they dominated the 1941-42 conference basketball season by posting a 13 – 2 record. A starting lineup consisting of Arthur "Jack" Smiley, Ken Menke, Andy Phillip, Ellis "Gene" Vance, Victor Wukovits and Art Mathisen, developed a winning attitude that would maintain for the next 15 years, a time period where the Illini would finish no less than third in the conference for 13 of them. The 1942 NCAA tournament was only in its fourth year of existence and was staged around the collegiate basketball coaches convention being held at Tulane University in New Orleans, Louisiana.  The warm weather and unsufferable humidity caused the young Illini to lose two games in a period of two days.

The final living Whiz Kid, Gene Vance, died in 2012.

Roster

Source

Schedule

|-
!colspan=12 style="background:#DF4E38; color:white;"| Non-Conference regular season

|- align="center" bgcolor=""

|-
!colspan=9 style="background:#DF4E38; color:#FFFFFF;"|Big Ten regular season

|-
!colspan=9 style="text-align: center; background:#DF4E38"|NCAA Tournament

Bold Italic connotes conference game
												
Source

Player stats

Awards and honors
Andy Phillip
National Player of the Year
Consensus All-American
Big Ten Player of the Year
Pic Magazine 2nd team All-American
Converse 3rd team All-American
Team Most Valuable Player 
Fighting Illini All-Century team (2005)
Gene Vance
Sporting News Honorable Mention All-American
Fighting Illini All-Century team (2005)
Jack Smiley
Sporting News Honorable Mention All-American
Art Mathisen
Sporting News Honorable Mention All-American
Ken Menke
Sporting News Honorable Mention All-American
Converse Honorable Mention All-American

References

Illinois Fighting Illini
Illinois Fighting Illini men's basketball seasons
1941 in sports in Illinois
1942 in sports in Illinois